Squalus is a genus of dogfish sharks in the family Squalidae. Commonly known as spurdogs, these sharks are characterized by smooth dorsal fin spines, teeth in upper and lower jaws similar in size, caudal peduncle with lateral keels; upper precaudal pit usually present, and caudal fin without subterminal notch. In spurdogs, the hyomandibula (the bone connecting the braincase to the jaws) is oriented at a right angle to the neurocranium, while in other sharks, the hyomandibula runs more parallel to the body. This led some to think that the upper jaw of Squalus would not be as protractile as the jaws of other sharks. However, a study that compared different jaw suspension types in sharks showed that this is not the case and that Squalus is quite capable of protruding its upper jaw during feeding.

The name comes from squalus, the Latin for shark; this word is the root for numerous words related to sharks such as squaline and scientific names for sharks, such as the order Squaliformes.

Species
Currently, 32 recognized species are placed in this genus:
 Squalus acanthias Linnaeus, 1758 (spiny dogfish) 
 Squalus albicaudus Viana, M. R. de Carvalho & U. L. Gomes, 2016 (Brazilian whitetail dogfish) 
 Squalus albifrons Last, W. T. White & J. D. Stevens, 2007 (eastern highfin spurdog)
 Squalus altipinnis Last, W. T. White & J. D. Stevens, 2007 (western highfin spurdog)
 Squalus bahiensis Viana, M. R. de Carvalho & U. L. Gomes, 2016 (northeastern Brazilian dogfish)  
 Squalus blainville (A. Risso, 1827) (longnose spurdog)
 Squalus brevirostris S. Tanaka (I), 1917 (Japanese shortnose spurdog)
 Squalus bucephalus Last, Séret & Pogonoski, 2007 (bighead spurdog)
 Squalus chloroculus Last, W. T. White & Motomura, 2007 (greeneye spurdog)
 Squalus clarkae Pfleger, Grubbs, Cotton & Daly-Engel, 2018 (Genie's dogfish)
 Squalus crassispinus Last, M. J. Edmunds & Yearsley, 2007 (fatspine spurdog)
 Squalus cubensis Howell-Rivero, 1936 (Cuban dogfish)
 Squalus edmundsi W. T. White, Last & J. D. Stevens, 2007 (Edmund's spurdog)
 Squalus formosus W. T. White & Iglésias, 2011 (Taiwan spurdog)
 Squalus grahami W. T. White, Last & J. D. Stevens, 2007 (eastern longnose spurdog)
 Squalus griffini Phillipps, 1931 (northern spiny dogfish)
 Squalus hawaiiensis Daly-Engel, Koch, Anderson, Cotton, Grubbs, 2018 (Hawaiian spurdog)
 Squalus hemipinnis W. T. White, Last & Yearsley, 2007 (Indonesian shortsnout spurdog)
 Squalus japonicus Ishikawa, 1908 (Japanese spurdog)
 Squalus lalannei Baranes, 2003 (Seychelles spurdog)
 Squalus lobularis Viana, M. R. de Carvalho & U. L. Gomes, 2016 (Atlantic lobefin dogfish) 
 Squalus megalops (W. J. Macleay, 1881) (shortnose spurdog)
 Squalus melanurus Fourmanoir & Rivaton, 1979 (blacktailed spurdog)
 Squalus mitsukurii D. S. Jordan & Snyder, 1903 (shortspine spurdog)
 Squalus montalbani Whitley, 1931 (Indonesian greeneye spurdog)
 Squalus nasutus Last, L. J. Marshall & W. T. White, 2007 (western longnose spurdog)
 Squalus notocaudatus Last, W. T. White & J. D. Stevens, 2007 (bartail spurdog)
 Squalus quasimodo Viana, M. R. de Carvalho & U. L. Gomes, 2016 (humpback western dogfish) 
 Squalus rancureli  Fourmanoir & Rivaton, 1979 (Cyrano spurdog)
 Squalus raoulensis Duffy & Last, 2007 (Kermadec spiny dogfish)
Squalus shiraii Viana & M. R. de Carvalho, 2020 (Shirai's spurdog) 
 Squalus suckleyi (Girard, 1855) (Pacific spiny dogfish)

See also
 List of prehistoric cartilaginous fish genera

References

 
Extant Campanian first appearances
Taxa named by Carl Linnaeus